Joel Davies (born 28 September 2003) is an Australian cricketer who plays for Sydney Thunder in the Big Bash League. He is a left-handed batsman and left arm orthodox spin bowler.

Career
Davies was playing Sydney Premier Cricket for Manly Warringah from the age of 14. He averaged over 114 as he captained NSW Metro to the 2022 national under-19 championships with Davies scoring 458 runs across 6 matches. This form led to his signing with the Sydney Thunder for the 2022–23 Big Bash League season. He made his Big Bash debut on 4 January 2023 against the Perth Scorchers taking 2 catches and being credited for 2 run outs.
Prior to that, he had caused another run out of Tim David with a direct hit as a substitute fielder against Hobart Hurricanes on 31 December 2022.

In December 2022 he was called up as captain to the Australia under-19 cricket squad to face the touring England under-19s. He had previously been a reserve for the 2022 ICC Under-19 Cricket World Cup.

Personal life
He is the younger brother of Australian cricketer Oliver Davies. In 2018, in different grades both brothers scored centuries for Manly against St George in the Sydney club competition, whilst their father Kevin was scoring a century for Warringah’s fourth grade Shires club. Through their mum, the Davies brothers are eligible to get a Trinidad passport and grew up supporting both Australia and the West Indies.

References

Living people
Australian cricketers
Sydney Thunder cricketers
Cricketers from New South Wales
2003 births